Dawn Neesom (born 11 December 1964) is an English journalist. She was promoted to the post of editor of the Daily Star newspaper in December 2003, but left at the end of February 2018.

Born in Stratford, London, England, Neesom attended Valentines High School in Ilford, Essex. Her mother was a cleaner and her father a lorry driver.

Neesom has claimed at various times that her career in journalism began on the local weekly newspaper the Newham Recorder, but this has been shown to be untrue and she no longer makes this claim. She also worked on Woman's Own magazine before joining The Sun newspaper as a feature writer in 1992. She was promoted to woman's editor before she joined the Daily Star as their woman's editor in 1997. Between 1997 and 2003, she was promoted to features editor and then associate editor (features) before, in September 2003, becoming joint deputy editor with Hugh Whittow. She left her post as the Daily Stars editor at the end of February 2018 after the take over by Reach plc, although she continues as a columnist for the newspaper.

She supports West Ham United and also practises kickboxing in her spare time.

Neesom is a regular guest on talkRADIO, frequently appearing on many of their shows, especially with Mike Graham, where she regularly joins Mike and others for the "Plank of the Week" segment, as well as guest hosting on the station. Neesom is also a regular guest on GB News.

References

External links

Dawn Neesom coverage at The Media Briefing
Dawn's 'Star' turn: a spoof too far?, James Silver, The Independent, 22 October 2006

1964 births
Living people
Daily Star (United Kingdom) people
English newspaper editors
People from Stratford, London
The Sun (United Kingdom) people